DPLL stands for:

 DPLL algorithm, for solving the boolean satisfiability problem
 Digital phase-locked loop, an electronic feedback system that generates a signal